Maurice Raymond Hallam (10 September 1931 — 1 January 2000) was an English first-class cricketer for Leicestershire. He was a right-handed opening batsman.

Hallam made his first-class debut for Leicestershire in 1950 and played his last game in 1970. He captained the county in 1963, 1964, 1965 and 1968.

Records
 A good slips fielder, Hallam took 56 catches in 1961 which remains a record for most catches in a season for Leicestershire .
 He scored a century in each innings of a match on 3 occasions, the most ever for the county .
 He is one of only four Leicestershire batsmen to make more than 2000 runs in a season, scoring 2096 in 1961 .
 His 23662 runs is second only to Les Berry for most ever runs for Leicestershire.

External links

 Maurice Hallam at Cricket Archive

1931 births
2000 deaths
Leicestershire cricketers
Leicestershire cricket captains
English cricketers
Players cricketers
Marylebone Cricket Club cricketers
A. E. R. Gilligan's XI cricketers
Non-international England cricketers